Perspecta was a directional motion picture sound system, invented by the laboratories at Fine Sound Inc. in 1954. The company was founded by Mercury Records engineer C. Robert (Bob) Fine, husband of producer Wilma Cozart Fine. As opposed to magnetic stereophonic soundtracks available at the time, Perspecta's benefits were that it did not require a new sound head for the projector and thus was a cheaper alternative.

Introduced as a "directional sound system" rather than a true stereophonic sound system, Perspecta did not use discretely recorded sound signals. Instead, three sub-audible tones at 30 Hz, 35 Hz, and 40 Hz are mixed appropriately and embedded in a monaural optical soundtrack, in addition to the audible sound. When run through a Perspecta integrator, depending on whenever each tone is present, the audio is fed into a left (30 Hz), center (35 Hz) and right (40 Hz) speaker. Unlike true stereophonic sound, which would be described as discrete tracks running in synchronization in time and phase, Perspecta merely panned a mono mix across various channels. Because of this, only isolated dialogue or sound effects could be mixed to be directional. Mixed sound effects, dialogue and music could not be suitably mixed. Aside from panning, Perspecta controlled gain levels for each channel through the amplitude of each control signal.

MGM Studios and Paramount Pictures were major supporters and developers of Perspecta. MGM used it on nearly everything that they released between mid-1954 to approximately 1958, including shorts, cartoons and trailers. Paramount used it, uncredited, on all their VistaVision pictures until it fell out of favor around 1958. In theory, the "High Fidelity" in VistaVision's trademark strongly implied high-fidelity sound, but, in reality, the system provided only higher-fidelity visual image, not higher-fidelity sound. Universal-International, Warner Bros., Columbia Pictures, United Artists, and Toho were among some of the other major studios to utilize Perspecta regularly.

List of Perspecta features

MGM
 Athena (1954)
 Bad Day at Black Rock (1955, also magnetic)
 Beau Brummell (1954)
 Bedevilled (1955, also magnetic)
 The Brothers Karamazov (1958)
 Forbidden Planet (1956, also magnetic)
 Gigi (1958, also magnetic)
 Gone with the Wind (1954 reissue)
 High Society (1956)
 Jailhouse Rock (1957)
 Kismet (1955)
 Knights of the Round Table (1953)
 The Last Hunt (1955)
 Lust for Life (1956)
 The Seventh Sin (1957)
 The Tender Trap (1955)

Paramount
 3 Ring Circus (1955)
 Artists and Models (1955)
 The Far Horizons (1955)
 Hell's Island (1955)
 The Man Who Knew Too Much (1956)
 Run for Cover (1955)
 The Seven Little Foys (1955)
 Strategic Air Command (1955)
 To Catch a Thief (1955)
 Vertigo (1958)
 War and Peace (1956) as "Perspecta Stereophonic Sound ® By Suonitalia Studio - Rome"
 We're No Angels (1955)
 White Christmas (1954)
 You're Never Too Young (1955)

Toho
 Battle in Outer Space (1959)
 Gorath (1962, also magnetic)
 The Hidden Fortress (1958)
 High and Low (1963, also magnetic)
 The H-Man (1958)
 King Kong vs. Godzilla (1962, also magnetic)
 The Last War (1961, also magnetic)
 Mothra (1961, also magnetic)
 The Mysterians (1957)
 Red Beard (1965, also magnetic)
 Sanjuro (1962)
 The Secret of the Telegian (1960)
 Varan the Unbelievable (1958)
 Yojimbo (1961)

United Artists
 The Barefoot Contessa (1954)
 Invasion of the Body Snatchers (1956)

Universal-International
 Away All Boats (1956)
 The Benny Goodman Story (1956)
 The Black Shield of Falworth (1954)
 One Desire (1955)
 This Island Earth (1955)
 The Spoilers (1955)

Warner Bros.
 East of Eden (1955, also magnetic)
 King Richard and the Crusaders (1954, also magnetic)
 Lucky Me (1954, also magnetic)

Some other films, such as Around the World in 80 Days (1956, United Artists) also used Perspecta to convert their non-encoded mono optical soundtracks to three channel surround.

See also
Duophonic, another form of "fake stereo"

References

External links
Extensive history of Fine Sound Inc.
The American Widescreen Museum (Perspecta wing)
1998 interview with Bob Eberenz, chief engineer at Fine Sound Inc.
2017 interview with Tom Fine, Part 1, Part 2, Part 3 – son of Robert Fine and Wilma Cozart Fine

Film and video technology
Surround sound